Biohazzard Records is a German Independent record label founded by music journalist Sascha Bahn and Alexander C.H. Lorenz.

Biohazzard is a sublabel of Danse Macabre Records. Its distribution companies are AL!VE and Kontor Media (digital distribution).

Since late 2007 the label has distributed promotional mp3 songs with BitTorrent.  Biohazzard disapproves of restrictive rights like DRM and distribute all their material without Digital Rights Management.

Schatten. TV is one of the oldest and largest German scene-television-company's which publish interviews of bands, important people around the gothic-scene over an own Internet Television channel. They have had an Internet Radio station since January 2008.

Releases 
 2000:  Sinnflut - Vergessene Melodien
 2001:  Sinnflut - Wortlosigkeit
 2003:  Silence - The p/o/u/r letters
 2003:  Sinnflut - Gefüge (Part I & II)
 2004:  Sinnflut - Im Anblick meines Augenblicks
 2006:  Eisenfunk - Funkferngesteuert
 2006:  Sanity Obscure - Resurrection
 2007:  Silence - the badtime stories e.p.
 2007:  Eisenfunk - Eisenfunk
 2007:  adoptedCHILD - geliebt-getötet (Digital Release)
 2008:  Agapèsis - Sacrilege
 2008:  MUMM! Compilation One - head//shot
 2008:  Piscide - elekktroshokk
 2008:  Sinnflut - Epik
 2008:  Eisenfunk - 300 (limited Edition)
 2008:  concrete/rage - [un]natural

Artists 
 Eisenfunk
 Silence
 Sinnflut
 Concrete/Rage
 Noctiferia

External links 
 Biohazzard Records in German language.

References

German independent record labels
World music record labels
Goth record labels
Electronic music record labels